Julien Bmjizzo (born Irankunda Julien) is a Rwandan music video director, filmmaker, and cinematographer.

Bmjizzo worked on his first music project, Only you by The Ben ft Ben Kayiranga, as a video director in 2015.  This first music project brought him to limelight in the Rwandan music industry and other countries as he started doing more music video jobs working as a director.

Early life and education 
Born in Kigali, Rwanda, Bmjizzo went to a school known as ESAPAG Gitwe in Rwanda but dropped at the end of his high school in 2011 due to the fact that his family was moving to Belgium. He continued his further education in Belgium at a school called Virgo Plus where he completed his high school education in Computer Science Management and Accounting. He later attended a University in Belgium where he studied Communication and Multi media.

Career 
Since 2015, Bmjizzo has worked  with notable Rwandan musicians and artists such as such The Ben, Bruce Melodie, Bulldog, and many more. In the same 2015, Bmjizzo established BproudMusic, a Belgium-based music production platform  that focuses on audio visual productions.

In 2021 Bmjizzo shot and directed a song titled Why by The Ben and Diamond Platnumz. This music project which went viral  further brought  Bmjizzo on greater  spotlight on the global music scene. In the same 2021, Bmjizzo produced his own song titled Kamwe which featured eleven Hip hop and RnB Rwandan artists.

Videography
Bmjizzo has produced over 100 music videos. The notable ones among them are chronicled below.

References

External links
 

Living people
Rwandan film directors
Rwandan musicians
1994 births
Rwandan cinematographers
Rwandan music video directors